is a Japanese sweet (wagashi), usually eaten at the beginning of the year. Hanabiramochi are also served at the first tea ceremony of the new year.

Origin
The name "hanabiramochi" literally means "flower petal mochi". The original form of Hanabiramochi is Hishihanabira, a dessert that was eaten by the Imperial family at special events coinciding with the beginning of the year.

Hanabiramochi was first made in the Meiji Era (8 September 1868 – 30 July 1912), but it is now a familiar New Year wagashi.

Form
The exact shape of hanabiramochi is strictly defined by tradition. The white mochi covering is flat and round, folded over to form a semicircular shape, and must have a pink color showing through in the center of the confection, fading to a white at the edge. Unlike a daifuku, the mochi must not completely seal the insides.

In the center of a hanabiramochi is a layer of anko, a sweet bean paste, commonly the white kind made from sweetened mung beans.  In the very center is a thin strip of sweetly flavoured gobo (burdock), which protrudes from the mochi on both sides.

Significance and symbolism
Each element of the hanabiramochi is significant:

The red colour showing through the white mochi is not only appropriate to the celebration of the new year, but also evokes the Japanese apricot/plum (ume) blossom, which in turn represents the purity, perseverance, and renewal associated with the New Year.

The gobo represents pressed ayu, a fish exclusive to East Asia, and a prayer for a long life.

See also
 Sakuramochi
 Hwajeon
 Japanese New Year

References 

Japanese cuisine
Wagashi
Chadō
Japanese New Year foods